Ahmad Al Fadhli (born 6 September 1982) is a Kuwaiti footballer who is a goalkeeper for Al-Yarmouk SC.

References

1982 births
Living people
Kuwaiti footballers
Sportspeople from Kuwait City
Association football goalkeepers
Kuwait international footballers
Al-Yarmouk SC (Kuwait) players
Kuwait Premier League players
Kazma SC players
Qadsia SC players
Salalah SC players
Kuwaiti expatriate sportspeople in Oman
Oman Professional League players
Expatriate footballers in Oman
Kuwaiti expatriate footballers